Milestones Hospital [] is a 10-bed mental hospital for women at Catfield, Norfolk. Milestones is owned by the Atarrah Project Ltd.

History
The Milestones Hospital, which was originally founded by mental health nurse Lisa Vescio, began taking patients early in 2007. It admits female patients who have been detained under the Mental Health Act.

References

External links
 
Care Quality Commission

Psychiatric hospitals in England